Lyutitsa Nunatak (Nunatak Lyutitsa \'nu-na-tak lyu-'ti-tsa\) is a rocky peak of elevation 430 m projecting from the ice cap in Breznik Heights on Greenwich Island, Antarctica.  Overlooking Musala Glacier to the north, east, and south.  Bulgarian topographic survey Tangra 2004/05.

The feature is named after the medieval fortress of Lyutitsa in the Eastern Rhodope Mountains, Bulgaria.

Location

Maps
 L.L. Ivanov et al. Antarctica: Livingston Island and Greenwich Island, South Shetland Islands. Scale 1:100000 topographic map. Sofia: Antarctic Place-names Commission of Bulgaria, 2005.
 L.L. Ivanov. Antarctica: Livingston Island and Greenwich, Robert, Snow and Smith Islands. Scale 1:120000 topographic map.  Troyan: Manfred Wörner Foundation, 2009.

References
 Lyutitsa Nunatak. SCAR Composite Gazetteer of Antarctica
 Bulgarian Antarctic Gazetteer. Antarctic Place-names Commission. (details in Bulgarian, basic data in English)

External links
 Lyutitsa Nunatak. Copernix satellite image

Nunataks of Greenwich Island
Bulgaria and the Antarctic